Milán Füst (17 July 1888, Budapest – 26 July 1967, Budapest) was a Hungarian writer, poet and playwright.

Biography
Early in life, his family lived on Dohány utca in the 7th district of Budapest.

In 1908 he met the writer Ernő Osvát and published his first work in the literary revue Nyugat. He befriended Dezső Kosztolányi and Frigyes Karinthy. After studying law and economics in Budapest, he became a teacher in a school of business. In 1918, he became the director of Vörösmarty Academy, but was forced to leave the post in 1921.

In 1928, a nervous breakdown led him to spend six months in a sanatorium in Baden-Baden. Already since 1904 he had begun working on his long Journal. However, a large part of this work, concerning the period 1944-1945 would later be destroyed.

In 1947, he became a teacher at Képzőművészeti Főiskola. He received the Kossuth Prize in 1948, and was a considered a contender for the 1965 Nobel Prize. His best-known novel, A feleségem története (The Story of My Wife), was published in 1942.

References

1888 births
1967 deaths
Jewish poets
Jewish novelists
Jewish dramatists and playwrights
Hungarian male poets
Hungarian male dramatists and playwrights
Hungarian male novelists
20th-century Hungarian poets
20th-century Hungarian novelists
20th-century Hungarian dramatists and playwrights
20th-century Hungarian male writers
Theatre people from Budapest